The 1946–47 season was Port Vale's 35th season of football in the English Football League, and their second full season in the Third Division South. It was their first full season following the outbreak of war in Europe, they thus continued where they left off in 1938–39, albeit after seven seasons of wartime football. Starting its post-war period modestly on the pitch with a tenth-place finish, the club still handed débuts to future legends Tommy Cheadle and Ronnie Allen, whilst work continued to complete 'The Wembley of the North'.

A club record was started on 19 October 1946, that would be completed on 13 March 1948, with a 33 long run of home games in which Vale's opposition failed to keep a clean sheet.

WWII Football
Two games into a standard 1939–40 season, Vale were bottom of the Third Division South, and when war was initiated on 1 September all sports gatherings were prohibited and the season was cancelled. A week later and Stoke-on-Trent was one of many places to be permitted to host football matches. However almost all of the club's players volunteered or were conscripted to fight Nazi Germany. Vale played numerous friendlies, as well as taking part in the regional war leagues. They finished eighth in the West League in 1939–40. Unable to raise sufficient finances from 1940 onwards, they only put forward an amateur side filled with young players in the North Staffordshire League, also entering cup competitions such as The Sentinel Cup. They recorded some very one-sided victories over local amateur teams such as Shelton Labour, Hanley Deep Pit, and Northwood Mission. Some of Vale's top professionals signed to sides such as Stoke City, Crewe Alexandra, and Manchester United. Players that guested for the club included names such as Peter Doherty, Micky Fenton, Frank Soo and Dennis Wilshaw. Guest players often made up half of the first eleven, filling the gaps left by Vale's players on active service.

The club came close to folding in summer 1943 when club president Mayor W.M.Huntbach died, leaving the club liable for £3,000 worth of debt, in addition to the £1,000 a year debit they were recording during the war. Appeals to The Football Association fell on deaf ears. The directors therefore agreed a £13,500 sale of The Old Recreation Ground to Stoke-on-Trent Corporation (the local council). Their application to the council to rent the stadium back was rejected. The sale was agreed without the support of shareholders, though the directors justified the sale by arguing that the stadium was a financial burden, especially as local vandals, hooligans and yobs regularly stole and trashed areas of the stadium. Nevertheless, Port Vale were then a club without any professional players and without a stadium. In October 1943 the council relented and allowed rent to be paid until April 1944. Then the council agreed to rent the stadium at a longer term for £400 a year.

The search for a new ground took them to Hamil Road, Burslem; opposite a site the club occupied between 1884 and 1886. The rough land used for fly-tipping was valued at £30,000, and the Brownhills Estates Company and the Supporters' Club launched a New Ground Appeal. In September 1944 the land was acquired, and work began on a 70,000 capacity 'Wembley of the North'. These were ambitious plans for a club that had in the past recorded attendances as low as 3,000 from fair-weather fans. In the meantime the club took part in the 1944–45 Football League North league. Club director and former Northern Ireland international Jack Diffin took the position of manager. He was replaced by David Pratt in December 1944. For the 1945–46 season they were placed in the Third Division South (North Region), with new manager Billy Frith. The Council agreed to allow the Vale to rent The Old Recreation Ground until 24 June 1950. Plans for the new stadium now were expanded to a massive 80,000 capacity.

Three former Port Vale players known to have been killed in the war were Tom Cooper, Haydn Dackins, and Sam Jennings. Meanwhile, Jack Roberts became a hero without losing his life, rising to the rank of Sergeant, he was captured in Tunisia, however managed to escape from a prisoner-of-war camp to return home.

Overview

Third Division South
Of the 1938–39 squad there were six who returned for the 1946–47 campaign: goalkeepers George Heppell and Arthur Jepson; defender Harry Griffiths; and midfielders Alf Bellis, Wilf Smith, and Don Triner. The rest had been recruited between 1939 and 1946. Three players specifically recruited in summer 1946 to help win promotion were experienced forward Colin Lyman (signed from Tottenham Hotspur for 'fairly substantial fee'); 'the assassin' Garth Butler (Derby County); and half-back Norman Hallam (Chelsea). Also £1,000 was spent on "The Rec", with 23 new barriers and six new turnstiles installed. Tickets were priced at £5 for a season, or one shilling on the day.

The season started with a goalless draw at the Withdean Stadium, before a 2–1 defeat by Exeter City in front of 14,490 home fans. This attendance was excellent, though would not be bettered all season. With Heppell in fine form in goal, Jepson was sold to Stoke City for £3,750. With Vale in poor form at the bottom of the league, manager Billy Frith resigned on 11 October, detailing a list of complaints against the directors, generally accusing them of undermining him and failing to support him sufficiently. Soon Cardiff City won at "the Rec" by four goals to nil, after which Lyman put in a transfer request. On 17 October, the club bought Jimmy Todd from Blackpool for then-club record fee, on the recommendation of Stanley Matthews. Lyman was then sold to Nottingham Forest for a higher fee than was paid for him earlier in the year. Gordon Hodgson was then appointed manager ahead of forty other applicants. Finding his team's unconvincing away from home he soon began to search for new players.

Results soon turned around, and Hodgson's coaching and planning were credited with the success. However many games were put on hold until May, due to the exceptionally disruptive winter weather. Hodgson also helped to set up a youth program, arranging visits to schools, trials, and the running of two junior sides. In March 1947 he signed centre-half Eric Eastwood from Manchester City for a four figure fee. Experimenting with the first eleven, from 10 March to 19 April the team went on a run of one victory in eight games. Promotion hopeless and re-election unlikely, the experiments proceeded into the postponed games in May, when three consecutive away 1–0 defeats were followed by high-scoring victories at home to Crystal Palace and Southend United. Also the experienced Jack Smith was brought in from Manchester United.

They finished in tenth place with 43 points from 42 games. Top scorer Morris Jones hit a very respectable tally of 26 goals, with double figure hauls from Bill Pointon and Alf Bellis.

Finances
On the financial side, a profit of £4,133 was recorded, then a club-record. League football had brought £20,872 in gross gate receipts, with the wage bill at £8,927. Twenty-one players were retained, and Harry Griffiths retirement was the only departure of note.

Cup competitions
In the FA Cup, Vale beat amateur side Finchley, league rivals Watford, and Second Division Millwall to reach the Fourth Round. There they came unstuck with a 2–0 defeat at Ewood Park to Second Division Blackburn Rovers in front of 32,900 spectators.

League table

Results
Port Vale's score comes first

Football League Third Division South

Results by matchday

Matches

FA Cup

Player statistics

Appearances

Top scorers

Transfers

Transfers in

Transfers out

References
Specific

General

Port Vale F.C. seasons
Port Vale